The year 1946 in archaeology involved some significant events.

Explorations
 Maria Reiche begins to map the Nazca Lines.
 Mikhail Mikhaylovich Gerasimov investigates the burial site of Yuri Dolgorukiy (d. 1157) at the Church of the Saviour at Berestove in Ukraine but no remains are found.

Excavations
 Ferriby Boats 1 and 2 excavated in England.
 Three-year excavation of Eridu by Fuad Safar and Seton Lloyd of the Iraqi Directorate General of Antiquities and Heritage begins.

Publications
 November - Agatha Christie Mallowan, Come, Tell Me How You Live.

Finds
 Lacandon Maya lead photographer/explorer Giles Healey to Bonampak, the first time it is known to have been visited by a non-Mayan.
 Filitosa, Corsica, discovered.

Awards

Miscellaneous

Births
 July 1 - Mick Aston, English archaeologist best known for his work on Time Team (died 2013)
 August 12 - Bryony Coles, née Orme, English prehistoric landscape archaeologist
 December 29 - Ruth Shady, Peruvian archaeologist

Deaths
 November 17 - Max von Oppenheim, German Near Eastern archaeologist (born 1860)

References

Archaeology
Archaeology
Archaeology by year